The Men's Long Jump F42/44 had its Final held on September 16 at 9:10.

Medalists

Results

References
Final

Athletics at the 2008 Summer Paralympics